Eamon Scanlon (born 20 September 1954) is a former Irish Fianna Fáil politician who served as a Teachta Dála (TD) from 2007 to 2011 and 2016 to 2020. He was a Senator for the Agricultural Panel from 2002 to 2007.

Personal life
Scanlon is a native of Ballymote, County Sligo. He is married to Ann Scanlon and they have six children. He is a butcher by trade and business owner since 1975. He subsequently, opened a business called 'Eamon Scanlon & Sons Auctioneers, Valuers and Estate Agents'. He is a member of the Governing Body of Letterkenny Institute of Technology and the Ballymote Community Enterprise Board.

Political life
He spent seven years on the National Executive of Fianna Fáil and was the Director of Elections for Matt Brennan. He was a member of Sligo County Council from 1991 to 2003, representing the Ballymote local electoral area. He was elected to the 22nd Seanad as a Senator for the Agricultural Panel in 2002. He was first elected to Dáil Éireann at the 2007 general election as a Fianna Fáil TD for Sligo–North Leitrim.

On 5 August 2009, he (along with fellow Sligo Fianna Fáil TD Jimmy Devins) resigned the party whip over his opposition to cuts in breast cancer services at Sligo University Hospital. He rejoined the parliamentary party on 13 January 2011.

He lost his seat at the 2011 general election. His first preference vote had declined from 23.2% in 2007 to 11.4%. He was an unsuccessful candidate at 2011 Seanad election.

He was elected to Sligo County Council for the Ballymote-Tubbercurry local electoral area at the 2014 local elections.

He regained his Dáil seat for Fianna Fáil at the 2016 general election. He lost his seat again at the 2020 general election.

References

External links

Eamon Scanlon's page on the Fianna Fáil website

 

1954 births
Living people
Fianna Fáil TDs
Irish auctioneers
Irish butchers
Local councillors in County Sligo
Members of the 22nd Seanad
Members of the 30th Dáil
Members of the 32nd Dáil
Fianna Fáil senators
Alumni of Letterkenny Institute of Technology